Valentyn Moskvyn (born 4 May 1968 in Ivano-Frankivsk) is a retired Ukrainian professional footballer. He made his professional debut in the Soviet Second League in 1985 for FC Prykarpattya Ivano-Frankivsk.

He scored the last goal of FC Dnipro Dnipropetrovsk in the Soviet Top League.

Moskvyn made one appearance for the Ukraine national football team in 1992.

Honours
 Ukrainian Premier League runner-up: 1993.
 Ukrainian Premier League bronze: 1992, 1995, 1996.
 Ukrainian Cup finalist: 1995.

References

1968 births
Living people
Sportspeople from Ivano-Frankivsk
Soviet footballers
Ukrainian footballers
Ukraine international footballers
Ukrainian expatriate footballers
Expatriate footballers in Israel
FC Spartak Ivano-Frankivsk players
FC Dnipro players
Hapoel Kfar Saba F.C. players
FC Kryvbas Kryvyi Rih players
Soviet Top League players
Ukrainian Premier League players
Association football forwards